NFF may refer to:

Festivals
 Netherlands Film Festival, a Dutch film festival
 National Folk Festival (disambiguation)
 Nicktoons Film Festival

Organizations
 National Farmers' Federation, a body representing farmers in Australia
 National Fatherland Front, an organization within the People's Democratic Party of Afghanistan
 National Football Foundation, non-profit to develop amateur American football, United States
 Nigeria Football Federation, Nigeria's football governing body
 Norwegian Football Federation, Norway's football governing body
 Norwegian Prison and Probation Officers' Union, the largest correctional services union in Norway

Other uses
 No fault found, used by engineers when responding to written fault reports